Lawangan may refer to:

 Lawangan language
 Lawangan people